Bellasize is a hamlet in the East Riding of Yorkshire, England.

History
The name of the hamlet derives from the French meaning beautiful seat (belle + assis, belasis, belasyse), and has the same derivation as Belsize. Historically in the wapentake and liberty of Howdenshire, the village now forms part of the civil parish of Blacktoft.

RAF Bellasize
Fields to the south of the village were used by the Royal Air Force (and the Royal Flying Corps) as RAF Bellasize between 1916 and 1919, and 1939–1945. During the First World War, the site was used by No.s 31 and 76 Squadrons in the Home Defence role. During this period, it was noted that the  site was prone to flooding from the nearby River Ouse. It was pressed back into service during the Second World War as a relief landing ground for No. 4 Elementary Flying Training School, who were based at nearby Brough airfield (to the east).

References

Villages in the East Riding of Yorkshire